Eva Šmeralová (born 28 August 1976) is a former Czech football defender. She played for, and captained, both Sparta Prague and the Czech national team.

Šmeralová was the most capped Czech international women's player with 71 appearances. She was named Czech female footballer of the year in 2000 and 2003.

Šmeralová started football at the age of 13 with Hradec Králové.

She started her international career in 1993 in a friendly match against Slovakia, scoring on her debut.

Šmeralová scored a hat-trick in the 2008 Czech Women's Cup final against Slavia, as Sparta won 5–1.

In 2009, Šmeralová joined SK DFO Pardubice.

References

1976 births
Living people
Sportspeople from Pardubice
Czech women's footballers
Czech Republic women's international footballers
Women's association football defenders
AC Sparta Praha (women) players
Czech Women's First League players